Thomas David Smith McDowell (January 4, 1823 – May 1, 1898) was a prominent slave-owner and North Carolina politician. He was born in Bladen County, North Carolina. He served in the state House from 1846 to 1850 and in the state senate from 1854 to 1858. He represented the state in the Provisional Confederate Congress and in the First Confederate Congress.

References

Deputies and delegates to the Provisional Congress of the Confederate States
Members of the Confederate House of Representatives from North Carolina
1823 births
1898 deaths